Spider's Web is a play by crime writer Agatha Christie. Spider's Web, which premiered in London’s West End in 1954, is Agatha Christie's second most successful play (744 performances), having run longer than Witness for the Prosecution, which premiered in 1953 (458 performances). It is surpassed only by Christie's record-breaking The Mousetrap, which has run continuously since opening in the West End in 1952.

Background
Spider's Web was written at the request of its star, Margaret Lockwood, whose main body of work was in films and who had never appeared in a West End production aside from Peter Pan. In 1953, Lockwood asked her agent, Herbert de Leon, to speak with Sir Peter Saunders, who was the main producer of Christie's work on the stage after the successes of The Hollow and The Mousetrap, and see if Christie would be interested in writing a play for her.

Saunders arranged a meeting between Christie and Lockwood at the Mirabelle restaurant. During the conversation, Lockwood requested that she not play a sinister or wicked part again (for which she was well known) but a role in a "comedy thriller." She also requested a part for Wilfrid Hyde-White, with whom she wanted to act and who was also on the books of de Leon. In any event, although the part was written, Hyde-White declined the role and Sir Felix Aylmer was cast instead.

Christie wrote the play during the period of the final rehearsals for Witness for the Prosecution, which opened to rave reviews in London on 28 October 1953. Lockwood's character was given the name of Clarissa, the name of Christie's beloved mother who had died back in 1926. Unasked, Christie also wrote a role which would be suitable for Lockwood's fourteen-year-old daughter, Julia, although Margaret Barton played the part in the finished production.

Although the play is an original piece, within it Christie utilised four plot devices from earlier works she had written:

In the play, Clarissa is offered the rental of the house in which she resides for only four guineas a month, whereas other inquirers are told the sum was eighteen guineas. This is to make sure that someone with the surname of Brown becomes resident to lure thieves to the house to steal something they think the real Mrs Brown possesses. This repeats the plot of the 1923 short story The Adventure of the Cheap Flat (published in book form in Poirot Investigates in 1924), where a couple called Robinson are cheaply let a flat so that they might act as unwitting decoys for two spies who are in fear of their lives and who were living under the alias of Mr and Mrs Robinson.
The item the thieves are after is revealed to be a rare stamp which is on an envelope containing other pieces of paper which are thought, throughout the play, to be the real attraction of attempts at theft. This plot device was first used in the 1941 story The Case of the Buried Treasure, printed in book form in the US as Strange Jest in the 1950 collection Three Blind Mice and Other Stories and in the UK in the 1979 collection Miss Marple's Final Cases and Two Other Stories. In the short story, a deceased man has left his great-niece and nephew a supposedly hidden fortune which Miss Marple deduces is in the form of a rare stamp on one of his otherwise innocuous-looking letters.
In the 1941 novel Evil Under the Sun, an adolescent girl experiments with witchcraft shortly before the victim is murdered, and then believes herself to be responsible for the murder
The group's alibi of playing bridge all evening is ruined when the Inspector notices a playing card on the floor across the room from the bridge table. A full deck of cards is needed to properly play bridge. Therefore, the Inspector knows the group could not have been playing several consecutive hands of bridge that evening. This is similar to an attempted alibi in the short story "King of Clubs," which appears in 'Poirot's Early Cases'. A family claims that they have been playing bridge all night and therefore cannot be involved in a murder that has occurred in their neighbour's house. Poirot sees through this lie after he discovers that a card (the King of Clubs) is missing from the pack on the table. This discovery proves the family's alibi of playing bridge was false and they have lied about their whereabouts that evening.

The play opened at the Theatre Royal, Nottingham on 27 September 1954, followed by a short national tour and then had its West End opening on 13 December 1954 at the Savoy Theatre, where it ran for 774 performances. With The Mousetrap and Witness for the Prosecution still running, Christie was at the peak of her West End career.

On 7 March 1955, Queen Elizabeth II, Prince Philip and Princess Margaret were among the audience for a performance of the play.

Synopsis

Act I
The action of the play passes in the drawing room of Copplestone Court, the Hailsham-Brown's home in Kent. The time: the present.

(An evening in March)

Clarissa Hailsham-Brown is the second wife of a Foreign Office diplomat, Henry, and stepmother to his daughter, Pippa, who is about twelve years old. They are currently living at Copplestone Court, a large house they are renting at a very cheap price in Kent. There are three guests staying with them: Sir Rowland Delahaye (Clarissa's Guardian in his fifties), Hugo Birch (an irascible man in his sixties and a local Justice of the Peace), and a young man named Jeremy Warrender. Sir Rowland and Hugo are taking part in a contest devised by Clarissa to test three different types of Port whilst Jeremy is trying to improve on the race time achieved by the Herzoslovakian minister, a previous guest to the house, who supposedly ran to the lodge gates and back three times in record time. Both contests however are spoofs designed by the fun-loving Clarissa to occupy her guests' time as their golf match has been rained off. The two older men move off to sample more of the Port, while Jeremy chats with Clarissa. He asks why she makes up stories, like the one he just tried to emulate, and she explains how nobody ever believes her when she tells the truth, but they believe her when she tells stories; and she explains that her life has always been peaceful and quiet, and these little tales are a way to make it a little more interesting.

Pippa then arrives home from school, hungry as always.  Clarissa takes her with her to find something to eat and, momentarily alone, Jeremy starts to investigate a desk in the room, quickly looking through the drawers until he is interrupted by the arrival of Miss Mildred Peake, a big, hearty country woman who lives in a cottage on the estate and acts as gardener. Having delivered her message for Clarissa, she leaves and Pippa reappears eating a bun and carrying a book she has bought which she mysteriously describes as a "recipe book" although it strangely speaks of candles. Asked by Jeremy if she likes living at Copplestone Court, Pippa enthuses over the house and shows Jeremy a hidden door at the back of the room which leads to a small recess. This in turn has another hidden door at the back which leads to the library.

Preparations are being made for the three guests to eat at the nearby golf club as it is the night off for the Elgins, Clarissa's married butler and cook. Sir Rowland congratulates Clarissa on her relationship with and handling of Pippa who had a bad time with her real mother, Miranda and her drug-supplying lover, Oliver Costello. A phone call to the house is strangely cut off when Clarissa tells the caller that she is not Mrs. Brown but Mrs. Hailsham-Brown. Clarissa tells Sir Rowland that the house used to belong to a Mr. Sellon, a now-deceased antique dealer in Maidstone and the furnishings are his. His former trade means that enquiries are received about some of his furniture, including one for the desk that, unbeknown to her, Jeremy had been searching through earlier. Walking in on the conversation, Pippa tells the two that she has found out that the desk has a secret drawer and she shows it to them together with its contents: an envelope with three autographed papers inside with the signatures of Queen Victoria, John Ruskin and Robert Browning on them.

Sir Rowland and the other two men leave for the golf club and soon after Clarissa receives another and very unwanted visitor: Oliver Costello, who tells her that Miranda wants Pippa living back with her and Costello, thus breaching the verbal agreement Henry reached with his ex-wife. Clarissa guesses that Miranda and Costello's real motive is to obtain money from Henry and she accuses him of blackmail, a word overheard by Elgin just as he enters the room to tell Clarissa that he and his wife are off out. When he has gone, Clarissa, in turn, threatens to expose Costello and Miranda's drug activities. Pippa comes into the room, appalled to see Costello there as she is terrified of the man. Clarissa throws him out of the house with the help of Miss Peake and Clarissa calms the hysterical Pippa down and sends her for her bath.

Henry comes home briefly. He tells his wife that he has been entrusted with holding a secret pre-conference meeting at his home with a foreign diplomat who is arriving that night and he leaves to meet them. The room is empty for a moment and Costello re-enters through the French windows. Like Jeremy before, he starts to go through the contents of the desk with the secret drawer. Behind him, the door of the hidden recess opens and an unseen hand clubs him down. He falls to the ground behind a sofa. After Clarissa shows her husband off, she re-enters the room and soon finds the body of Costello. Almost instantly Pippa comes through the hidden recess and starts babbling hysterically that she is responsible. Clarissa tries to calm her down while wondering what she will do...

Act II, Scene 1
(The same. A quarter of an hour later)

Pippa has been put to bed with a sleeping draught. Clarissa has set up a card table for bridge when her three guests arrive back, summoned by a phone call from her. She asks them to move the body to Costello's car which she knows is parked some distance from the house to a local wood. Their alibi will be the bridge game for which she has set up the cards with false scores to indicate the progress of some time having elapsed. She tells them that her motive is Henry's diplomatic visit. The three somewhat incredulous men fall in uneasily with her plan but only after Sir Rowland has been told by Clarissa of Pippa's supposed involvement. Wearing gloves supplied by Clarissa, they manage to move the body back into the recess, with the intention of moving him later, but are interrupted when the police unexpectedly arrive. Inspector Lord is there following a mysterious phone call to the station telling them that a murder has been committed at the house.

In the initial questioning, it comes to light that the previous owner of the house, Sellon, was found dead in his shop, supposedly from a fall down the stairs, but it might have been more nefarious than that. There were suspicions of involvement in drugs and Sellon also left a note to the effect that he had come across something worth fourteen thousand pounds but no one has yet found out what the item was.

In the meantime, the police have located Costello's car in the grounds with documents showing his identity inside it. Clarissa has to admit to his visit and Miss Peake is summoned to the main house to testify that she showed him off the grounds earlier in the evening. Unfortunately, not knowing of the subterfuge of Clarissa and the three men, she also tells of the hidden recess. Clarissa is forced to open it and Costello's body is exposed…

Act II, Scene 2
(The same, ten minutes later)

Miss Peake, suffering hysterics, has been helped upstairs. Clarissa has been fed a glass of brandy and has now recovered and, after closing the recess door to hide the unpleasant sight of the body, the police question all the people separately. Elgin and his wife have returned early from their night off as she was ill and he testifies to hearing Clarissa talking to Costello of blackmail. During the questioning of Jeremy, the Inspector finds the gloves used to move Costello that were hurriedly hidden in the drawing room by the three men when the police arrived. He also finds one of the playing cards from the pack dropped accidentally by Pippa earlier (during Act I while playing patience) but whose absence was not noticed by Clarissa when setting up the false bridge game.

When questioning Sir Rowland, Lord finds differences between the stories of the people involved. Sir Rowland, concerned that the Inspector strongly suspects Clarissa of the crime, tells her to tell the police the truth. Desperate to shield Pippa, most of the story she tells is truthful except for the confession of her stepdaughter. Under some duress from Lord, she is forced to change her tale again and this time confesses to the crime herself, albeit stating that she killed Costello thinking he was a burglar. Questioned over Elgin's remembrance of the use of the word "blackmail", she states that this was a discussion over the cheap rental they are being charged for the house – four guineas a week. Sir Rowland comes back into the room, despite being told to keep out, desperate to find out how Clarissa is doing and is appalled to hear of her own confession. Taking Clarissa through her story more carefully, the recess door is opened and the Inspector receives a shock – the body has gone!

Act III
(The same. A few minutes later)

Everyone is thoroughly confused by the two mysteries – who moved the body and who rang the police? While the police are searching the house and grounds, Miss Peake comes downstairs and tells Clarissa and her three guests that she is responsible for the body being moved in order that a charge couldn't be made against her as the primary evidence is missing. She wasn't in the hysterical state that she made out and, hearing how things were developing, the strong woman removed the body from the recess from the library side and hid it under the bolster of the bed she was "recovering" on. Pippa also comes downstairs, still drowsy over her sleeping pill and talking about seeing policemen in her room in her dreams. She also thinks that her sighting of Oliver was a dream and links this to the wax doll she produces – her "recipe" book was an ancient book on witchcraft and this explains why she confessed to killing Costello: she thought her "spells" had done the deed.

This adds another mystery – who did kill Costello? Pippa is helped to lie on the sofa and Clarissa is suddenly struck by something Hugo said earlier when he stated that Sellon's antique shop was called "Sellon and Brown". She remembers the phone call asking for Mrs. Brown and a comment made by Costello to Miss Peake before she showed him from the house to the effect that he came "to see Mrs. Brown" and she realises that Miss Peake is, in fact, Mrs. Brown, Sellon's former partner. Miss Peake admits the fact and explains that Clarissa was given the rent of the house cheaply to install another Mrs Brown to lure other fortune hunters who were after Sellon's unknown amazing discovery. She laughs off the apparent danger she put Clarissa in stating that she kept a very close eye on things, such as her being on the scene when Costello was threatening her earlier in the evening.

Sir Rowland wonders if there is anything written on the autographed papers in invisible ink and they test them, revealing the names of six distributors of drugs, including Costello. Going to tell the police their findings, the sleeping Pippa is left alone and, after a moment, Jeremy re-enters and is about to smother the girl's face with a cushion when Clarissa comes back. She soon realises that he is the killer. He was away from the other two men for a time after they had gone to the club to eat and a remark Pippa made about seeing his golf club ("A golf stick like Jeremy had", in the context of the weapon used to kill Costello) ties in. He also rang the police to try to incriminate Clarissa. Jeremy confesses; his motive was the envelope that the autographed papers were kept in – on it is an extremely rare error stamp worth the fourteen thousand pounds. 

He is about to kill Clarissa when the police enter the room, having heard the exchange, and arrest him. They take him away. The others go to bed and Henry returns but without his diplomatic guests who have failed to turn up. But then he gets a call that the apparent failure of the visiting dignitary to arrive was a deliberate ruse for security purposes; that he has now arrived; and he and the foreign minister are on their way to the house -- which he and Clarissa must now tidy-up very quickly. 

When Henry protests, "You promised to have everything ready", Clarissa starts to explain everything that went on that evening. But like the police inspector, he fails to believe a word she says. 

Apparently, it is just Clarissa's lot in life that no-one will believe her when she tells the truth.

Reception
Kenneth Tynan was a fan, writing in The Observer , “Those who grieve that our drama is a ritualistic art no longer should see Mrs. Christie’s Spider’s Web and be consoled, for the detective play, in which a nameless avenger strikes down a chosen victim is governed by conventions every bit as strict as those of Greek tragedy. Audiences who emerged from Witness for the Prosecution murmuring ‘How clever she is!’, will probably emerge from Spider’s Web murmuring ‘How clever I am!’”.

With 744 performances Spider’s Web clearly appealed to audiences—despite mixed reviews from some critics--as it enjoyed the longest first run of any Christie play apart from The Mousetrap. For instance The Times was not overly enthusiastic in its review of 15 December 1954 when it said, "Miss Agatha Christie tries this time to combine a story of murder with a comedy of character. As Edgar Wallace showed more than once, this thing can be done. There is no reason why the special tension of the one should not support the special tension of the other. In this instance, however, the support is at best intermittent. There is a risk that those that are chiefly concerned to find out who murdered the odious blackmailer will hardly regard the solution as one of the author's happiest. There is a like risk that the rest of the audience will be bored with a comedy which has to accommodate itself to the requirements of a long police interrogation. The common ground on which both sections may stand is dangerously small." The reviewer admitted that, "the thriller gives all the characters a turn and yet contrives at the end to produce a twist. It is a twist which surprises rather than satisfies the logical mind." but they concluded, "the play as a whole is the least exciting and not the most amusing of the three Agatha Christie's now running in London."

Alvin Klein, reviewing a 1997 production for The New York Times, fell for the play’s inherent comedy and the appeal of its main character, saying “What sets Spider's Web apart from most specimens of its overstuffed genre, is that its real motive is fun; all else—dropped clues, plot contrivances—is secondary. And the Lady of Copplestone Court, Clarissa Hailsham-Brown, has a talent to amuse.”

Credits of London production
Director: Wallace Douglas

Cast of London production:

 Margaret Lockwood as Clarissa Hailsham-Brown
 Felix Aylmer as Sir Rowland Delahaye
 Harold Scott as Hugo Birch
 Myles Eason as Jeremy Warrender
 Margaret Barton as Pippa Hailsham-Brown, Clarissa's young stepdaughter
 Judith Furse as Mildred Peake
 Sidney Monckton as Elgin, the Butler
 Charles Morgan as Oliver Costello
 John Warwick as Henry Hailsham-Brown, Clarissa's husband
 Campbell Singer as Inspector Lord
 Desmond Llewelyn as Constable Jones

Publication
The play was first published by Samuel French Ltd. in 1957 as French's Acting Edition No. 834.

Novelisation
Like Black Coffee (1998) and The Unexpected Guest (1999), the script of the play was turned into a novel of the same name by Charles Osborne. It was published in the UK by HarperCollins in 2000.

Film adaptations

1955 TV adaptation
The play was adapted for BBC TV in 1955 starring Margaret Lockwood. Wallace Douglas directed. Lockwood would not reprise her performance in the feature film version.

Cast
Margaret Lockwood as Clarissa Hailsham-Brown
Felix Aylmer as Sir Rowland Delahaye
Myles Eason as Jeremy Warrender
Harold Scott as Hugo Birch
Campbell Singer as Inspector Lord
Desmond Llewelyn as Constable Jones
Sidney Monckton as Elgin
Judith Furse as Mildred Peake
Charles Morgan as Oliver Costello

1956 TV adaptation
The play was next adapted as a television movie aired in West Germany on 19 August 1956.

1960 film adaptation
In 1960, the play was turned into a film with the slightly extended title of The Spider's Web. Glynis Johns played the part of Clarissa with none of the actors from the stage production making the cross-over to the film. The screenplay, adapted from Christie's text, was by Eldon Howard and direction was by Godfrey Grayson.

1982 TV adaptation
In 1982, the BBC produced the work as a one-hour-and-forty-five-minute television play which starred Penelope Keith in the role of Clarissa. Cedric Messina was the producer with Basil Coleman directing. This version was broadcast in December on BBC Two.

Cast of the 1982 BBC production:

Penelope Keith – Clarissa Hailsham-Brown
Robert Flemyng – Sir Rowland Delahaye
Thorley Walters – Hugo Birch
David Yelland – Jeremy Warrender
Elizabeth Spriggs – Mildred Peake
Jonathan Newth – Henry Hailsham-Brown
Holly Aird – Pippa Hailsham-Brown
Brian Protheroe – Oliver Costello
John Barcroft – Inspector Lord
Mark Draper – Sergeant Jones
David Crosse – Elgin
Lee Fox – Doctor

References

External links

Plays by Agatha Christie
1954 plays
British plays adapted into films